Noshir Minoo Shroff is an Indian ophthalmologist, known as a pioneer of intraocular lens implantation surgery in India and a medical director of the Shroff Eye Centre. The Government of India honoured him in 2010, with the Padma Bhushan, the third highest civilian award, for his services in the field of medicine.

Biography

Noshir M. Shroff was born on 23 August 1951, in the Indian capital of New Delhi to a family of ophthalmologists. His grand father, S. P. Shroff, was a Fellow of the Royal College of Surgeons Edinburgh and also the founder of Dr. Shroff's Charity Eye Hospital. His father, Minoo Shroff, was also an ophthalmologist. After early schooling at Modern School, New Delhi, Noshir carried out his graduate studies in ophthalmology at the Maulana Azad Medical College, Delhi University in 1973, and post-graduate studies in 1978. He earned a master's degree in Minimal Access Surgery (MMAS). In 1978, Shroff joined the family clinic, Shroff Eye Centre where he initiated cataract, intraocular lens and refractive surgery.

Career highlights and legacy

Shroff was a pioneer of Intraocular Lens implantation surgery in India  and has performed over 30,000 surgeries. He was also one of the first ophthalmologists in India to launch Phacoemulsification (microincision sutureless cataract surgery), in 1992. He introduced keratorefractive surgery in India, and has carried out over 5000 photorefractive keratectomy, LASIK, LASEK, Epi-LASIK and intralase (bladeless lasik surgery) procedures. Shroff is credited with a number of innovations in cataract surgery such as improved design of instruments, techniques and protocols. A drip controlling device used in Immersion A-scan Biometry is one such device, which helps the surgeon to get more accurate eye measurements for calculating intraocular lens power.

Shroff has opened a training center at Shroff Eye Centre for post graduate degree in ophthalmology. The center has been recognized by the National Board of Examinations.

Shroff Charity Eye Hospital has opened centers at various remote areas in Rajasthan, Haryana and Uttar Pradesh. Shroff is also associated with Project Prakash, an initiative aimed at providing medical assistance to disabled children and understanding learning and plasticity in the brain. The project is conducted in association with Massachusetts Institute of Technology, USA. Shroff has also carried out charitable work with Orbis International, medical centers in Zamrudpur village with the Delhi Commonwealth Women's Association (DCWA), and in Srinivaspuri with Savera India.

Shroff Eye Centre

Dr. Shroff's Charity Eye Hospital was established in 1914 and made into a full-fledged eye hospital in 1926, by S. P. Shroff, the grandfather of Noshir Shroff. In 1972, Minoo Shroff, expanded the practice with a new clinic in the Surya Kiran building in CP and in Kailash colony in 1973 under the name of Shroff Eye Centre.

Shroff has treated dignitaries such as Dalai Lama and the President of India.

Medical positions
 Honorary ophthalmologist to the President of India
 Trustee, Senior Consultant and Advisor – Shroff Charity Eye Hospital, New Delhi
 Medical Director – Shroff Eye Centre
 Trainer – Diplomate National Board (DNB) program for training young ophthalmologists
 Patron – R. K. Devi Eye Research Institute, Kanpur

Social positions
 President – Ophthalmological Society of India, Delhi
 Secretary General – II International Congress of Intraocular Implant Society – New Delhi – 1992
 Member, Executive Committee – Intraocular Lens Implant and Refractive Society – India – 1990–98

Awards and recognitions
 Padma Bhushan – 2010
 Dr. Krishna Sohan Singh Trophy for Best Clinical Talk – 1983–84 – Ophthalmological Society of India, Delhi>
 Dr. Krishna Sohan Singh Trophy for Best Clinical Talk – 1986–87 – Ophthalmological Society of India, Delhi>
 G. K. Panthaki Award – 1997 – Federation of Parsi Zoroastrian Anjumans of India
 Bharat Jyoti Award and Certificate of Excellence – 2003 – India International Friendship Society
 Nargis Adi Gandhi Memorial Award – Federation of Parsi Zoroastrian Anjumans of India

Keynote addresses
 Dr. P. N. Sinha Oration – 36th annual conference of Bihar Ophthalmological Society of India, Gaya – 28–29 November 1998 on Evolution of Cataract Surgery – The Quest for Excellence
 Oration – Federation of Ophthalmic Research and Education Centre, India Habitat Centre, New Delhi – 19 November 2005 on Advances in Phaco-emulsification
 Dr. C. Shekhar Grover Oration – Uttara Eyecon 2006, Dehradun – 7–8 October 2006 on From Couching to Today's Cataract Refractive Surgery – A Giant Leap

References

External links
 Catastrophic complication, Endophthalmitis, after a cataract surgery – video by Dr. Noshir M. Shroff on YouTube

1951 births
Living people
Recipients of the Padma Bhushan in medicine
Indian ophthalmologists
Indian surgeons
Medical doctors from Delhi
Articles containing video clips
20th-century Indian medical doctors
Parsi people
20th-century surgeons